The mixed team snowboard cross competition in snowboarding at the 2022 Winter Olympics was held on 12 February, at the Genting Snow Park in Zhangjiakou. This was the first time a mixed snowboarding event would be featured at the Olympics. Nick Baumgartner and Lindsey Jacobellis of the United States won the event. Jacobellis added a second gold to the one she won two days earlier in the individual snowboard cross (which was also Team USA's first 2022 Olympic gold), while Baumgartner won his first Olympic medal. Omar Visintin and Michela Moioli of Italy won the silver medal, and Éliot Grondin and Meryeta O'Dine of Canada bronze.

At the 2021–22 FIS Snowboard World Cup, only one mixed team snowboard cross event was held before the Olympics. Italy won, ahead of the Czech Republic and France. However, Eva Samková from the Czech team was injured during the event and had to miss the Olympics. Australia are the 2021 World Champions, with Italy and France being the silver and bronze medalists, respectively.

United States-1, Canada-1, Italy-1, and Italy-2 made it to the big finals. In the women's run, O'Dine and Caterina Carpano, who were on positions 3 and 4, fell, leaving Moioli and Jacobellis to decide on gold and silver. Moioli was initially leading, but Jacobellis managed to overtake her taking the gold.

Qualification

A total of 16 teams (32 snowboarders) qualified to compete at the games. A country could enter a maximum of two teams into the event.

Results

Quarterfinals 
 Q — Qualified for the semifinals
Heat 1

Heat 2

Heat 3

Heat 4

Semifinals
 Q — Qualified for the finals
Heat 1

Heat 2

Finals

Small final

Big final

References

Snowboarding at the 2022 Winter Olympics
Mixed events at the 2022 Winter Olympics